is the 15th single of Japanese rock band Asian Kung-Fu Generation from their album Magic Disk. The single was released on May 26, 2010. The first track is the main theme for the anime "Yojō-Han Shinwa Taikei" (The Tatami Galaxy), which features character design from Yusuke Nakamura, the same artist who illustrates their CD covers. Maigoinu to Ame no Beat is also their first song to feature brass instruments.

Track listing

Personnel
Masafumi Gotō – lead vocals, rhythm guitar
Kensuke Kita – lead guitar, background vocals
Takahiro Yamada –  bass, background vocals
Kiyoshi Ijichi – drums
Asian Kung-Fu Generation – producer

Charts

Release history

References 

2010 singles
2010 songs
Asian Kung-Fu Generation songs
Ki/oon Music singles
Anime songs
Songs written by Masafumi Gotoh